Herbert Macauley "Mac" McEver (September 14, 1906 – January 21, 1996) was an American football player and coach of football, basketball, and baseball.  He served as the head football coach at Virginia Agricultural and Mechanical College and Polytechnic Institute (VPI)—now known as Virginia Tech—from 1942 to 1945, compiling a record of 9–8–1.  He was co-head coach with Sumner D. Tilson in 1942.  McEver was also the head basketball coach at VPI from 1937 to 1944, amassing a record of 49–71, and the school's head baseball coach From 1933 to 1939, tallying a mark of 41–72–1.

McEver played football at VPI from 1925 to 1928 as part of the famed "Pony Express" backfield.  He was inducted into the Virginia Sports Hall of Fame in 1980 and the Virginia Tech Sports Hall of Fame, which he helped organize, in 1983.  He was the older brother of Gene McEver, who starred in football at the University of Tennessee and served as the head football coach at Davidson College and the University of North Carolina at Chapel Hill.

Head coaching record

Football

Basketball

References

1906 births
1996 deaths
Virginia Tech Hokies baseball coaches
Virginia Tech Hokies football coaches
Virginia Tech Hokies football players
Virginia Tech Hokies men's basketball coaches